Hindostan is an unincorporated community in Northwest Township, Orange County, in the U.S. state of Indiana.

Geography

References

Unincorporated communities in Orange County, Indiana
Unincorporated communities in Indiana